Aequatorium is a genus of flowering plants in the aster family. It was described as a genus in 1978. It is a member of the tribe Senecioneae and native to South America.

Species

, Plants of the World online has 13 accepted species:

Selected synonyms include:
 Aequatorium carpishense  — synonym of Nordenstamia carpishensis 
 Aequatorium cajamarcense  — synonym of Nordenstamia cajamarcensis 
 Aequatorium juninense  — synonym of Nordenstamia juninensis 
 Aequatorium limonense  — synonym of Nordenstamia limonensis 
 Aequatorium repandum  — synonym of Nordenstamia repanda 
 Aequatorium rimachianum   — synonym of Nordenstamia rimachiana 
 Aequatorium stellatopilosum  — synonym of Nordenstamia stellatopilosa 
 Aequatorium tovarii  — synonym of Nordenstamia tovarii 
 Aequatorium tuestae  — synonym of Nordenstamia tuestae 

See Nordenstamia for more species

References

External links
 

 
Flora of South America
Asteraceae genera
Taxonomy articles created by Polbot